Lake Markacocha (possibly from Quechua marka village, qucha lake) is a lake in Peru located in the Junín Region, Yauli Province, Marcapomacocha District. Lake Marcacocha lies north of Lake Marcapomacocha and southwest of Mount Mishipañahuin.

References 

Lakes of Peru
Lakes of Junín Region